The Seal of the City and County of Denver, also known as The Seal of Denver or The Denver Corporate Seal, is the official seal of the government of Denver, Colorado, USA.

Current seal
The corporate seal of the City and County of Denver (shown right) was designed by Denver artist Henry Read in 1901. The circular design features an American eagle, reminding us that Denver is a free, American city. The key symbolizes Denver as the key to the Rocky Mountains, and represents the warmth and hospitality extended by Denver citizens to visitors. The capitol dome is included in the seal, as Denver is the capital of the state of Colorado.

Historic seal
The Omaha and Grant Smelter smokestack that were depicted in the seal design was built in 1883, on the east bank of the Platte River. The tall smokestack, built in 1892, was for years the world's tallest structure. It was demolished on February 26, 1950, to clear land for the today's Denver Coliseum. Denver's view of the front range of the Rocky Mountains was shown as a background, with the rays of the setting sun lighting the sky.

See also
Denver, Colorado
State of Colorado

References

External links
The City and County of Denver
The History of Denver, by the City and County of Denver
The History of the Seal, by the City and County of Denver
The State of Colorado

Official seals of places in Colorado
Images
Government of Denver